The Grand Tower Pipeline Bridge is a suspension bridge carrying a natural gas pipeline across the Mississippi River between Wittenberg, Missouri and Grand Tower, Illinois.

Construction
Although construction of a natural gas pipeline under the Mississippi River would have been cheaper, this option would have created great difficulty in handling any leaks and maintenance, so it was decided to construct a bridge to carry the gas pipeline. The bridge was the first pipeline suspension bridge to cross the Mississippi River. It was constructed for the Texas–Illinois Natural Gas Pipeline company for an estimated $3,800,000 in 1953 (equivalent to $ in ). Work began in September, 1953. The bridge features two  steel framework towers, one on each side of the river. During construction the  pipes were stretched out across the river where welders connected them together. Each pipe weighs 5 tons and it took 72 pipes to span the river, adding to around 360 tons of dead weight. The site at Grand Tower/Wittenberg was chosen because the river is narrow and deep there, and the limestone bedrock could be easily reached.

See also 
List of crossings of the Upper Mississippi River

References

External links
Bridgemeister
Midwest Places
Bridgehunter
 

Suspension bridges in Missouri
Suspension bridges in Illinois
Bridges over the Mississippi River
Bridges completed in 1955
Transportation buildings and structures in Jackson County, Illinois
Steel bridges in the United States
1955 establishments in Illinois
1955 establishments in Missouri